Multi-Man (Duncan Pramble) is a fictional character that has been both a superhero and a supervillain in DC Comics comic books, primarily as a villain for the Challengers of the Unknown. His first appearance was in Challengers of the Unknown #14 (July 1960), and the character quickly became a recurring enemy. He appeared in at least one issue a year through 1968. In 1965, Multi-Man brought several of the CotU villains together into a League of Challenger-Haters.

Fictional character biography
Originally an enemy of the Challengers of the Unknown, Pramble consumes a substance known as "Liquid Light" found in an ancient temple. The effect of this substance is that whenever he dies, he resurrects with a different, random superpower, often becoming "energy beings" or monsters. The side effect of this is that his head grows disproportionately large (with pointed ears and large eyes) and his body becomes small and weak. For years, he is one of the Challengers' most persistent foes, the founder of the League of Challenger-Haters and the creator of the giant android Multi-Woman. With the Challenger-Haters, he also battles the Doom Patrol on one occasion.

With several other villains, Multi-Man becomes a member of the Injustice League, a team of out-of-luck supervillains who, when banding together, become even less successful than they have been in their individual careers. During this time, he reveals that his many deaths and resurrections have left him with a form of bipolar disorder. The Injustice League is defeated time and again by the Justice League International, at least when they are not making laughingstocks of themselves. Trying to reform, the members later become the core of the equally laughable hero team Justice League Antarctica. This JLA includes G'nort, who ends up saving the lives of the entire team. Like his compatriots, Pramble becomes an ardent supporter of Maxwell Lord, partly because he is the only one willing to hire them. His group even guards Lord when he is incapacitated by a bullet wound. The villains again later reform as the Injustice League as henchmen of Sonar.

Death and redemption
He drifts away from the League and becomes a supermarket bagger. During the 1991 Challengers of the Unknown mini-series, he is prompted by the seeming 'personification of all evil' to destroy Challenger Mountain with a bomb. This bomb, combined with the energies of the evil entity, causes the deaths of hundreds of innocent civilians and two of the Challengers themselves. Duncan later makes up for this. While the Challengers and their new reporter ally, Moffet, are confronting the entity, he sneaks onto the battlefield. He takes a neutron bomb from Moffet's hands and dives into the creature's mouths. Both are seemingly destroyed. The entire incident is reported as a small article in the newspaper, written by Lois Lane, focusing on his death and little else.

Later, Multi-Man appears alive in the Belle Reve Prison riot where he and others manage to defeat Green Lantern after his ring is stolen. This is his second riot in a short period of time. He is involved with the Outsiders when they had been sent to prison on a false murder charge.

Multi-Man, now taller and fitter, is eventually 'volunteered' for the Suicide Squad by his former Injustice League ally, Major Disaster. On their first mission he is shot dead during a battle against a mad scientist and his biologically created servants. Some of his Injustice League friends also die in this battle.

Later, he has returned to life and was a part of the Joker: Last Laugh crossover in which the Joker killed him hundreds of times until he possesses the power required to break his collar and give the villains the chance to reach Doctor Polaris. The Slab's two surviving guards were subsequently forced to repeat the process after the villain Black Mass is killed after shifting the entire Slab into an alternate dimension in the hopes that Multi-Man would manifest an ability that could be used to undo Black Mass's actions, Multi-Man eventually gaining the ability to reanimate dead tissue to restore Black Mass to life to reverse the process. Multi-Man was subsequently given some light duties in the Slab for his assistance.

Powers and abilities
Multi-Man consumed a Liquid Light serum that gave him the power to be instantly resurrected after dying, each time with extraordinary new abilities. These powers he have obtained include (but are not limited to) the following:

 Telepathy
 Empathy for others' pain
 Super conductive skin
 Blood turns metal to acid
 Body can become two-dimensional
 Involuntary shrinking
 Reanimating dead tissue
 Enlarged cranium

References

Comics characters introduced in 1960
DC Comics supervillains
DC Comics metahumans
DC Comics telepaths
DC Comics characters who are shapeshifters
Fictional characters who can change size
DC Comics characters who have mental powers
Fictional characters with bipolar disorder
Fictional characters with elemental transmutation abilities
Fictional characters with death or rebirth abilities
Fictional empaths